Johanna Sophia Kettner (24. January 1722 - 22 January 1802), was a german soldier.

She born in Titting, Franconia, in 1722. In 1743, she enlisted in the Imperial Army in the guise of a man named Johann Kettner. She served in the prestigious Hagenbach infantry regiment of the Austrian army for about five years. During her service, she was promoted to the rank of corporal. As such, she was most likely the first of her gender in Austria, as this post was not legally available for women.

In 1748, while undergoing treatment for severe illness, she was discovered to be female and was discharged from the army with honours. Empress Maria Theresa granted her a lifelong pension as a corporal. Johanna Kettner died on 22 January 1802 in Eichstätt.

Kettner became known in history for her achievement which was unique for a woman in the Austrian army at the time.

See also
 Franziska Scanagatta

References

Sources

1722 births
1802 deaths
Female wartime cross-dressers
Women in 18th-century warfare
Austrian military personnel of the War of the Austrian Succession
Women in European warfare
18th-century Austrian military personnel
Austrian soldiers
People from Eichstätt (district)